Shazhen is a town in Dongchangfu District, Liaocheng, in western Shandong province,   China.

References

Township-level divisions of Shandong